Grayson Creek is a stream in Contra Costa County in northern California that flows northeasterly  from its origin in Briones Regional Park to Pacheco Slough four miles east of Martinez. Pacheco Slough, in turn, connects to Suisun Bay. The Grayson Creek subwatershed is part of the Walnut Creek watershed and includes the cities of Pleasant Hill and Pacheco, California.

Murderer's (aka Murderous) Creek is a seasonal drainage creek also located in Pleasant Hill. Murderous Creek was named when the surveyors found a victim hanging from a tree near the stream in 1849. Today, large portions of the Creek have disappeared, but it can be found meandering through several residential subdivisions below the hillside near Pleasant Hill Road and Withers Avenue. The portion of Murderer's Creek that remains is being heavily surcharged and overburdened by the discharge of runoff water into the Creek from County roads and from upslope private developments, and the riparian property owners are experiencing extensive erosion and subsidence issues.

Flood control and restoration
On January 10, 2017, Sequoia Elementary was flooded from water in the Grayson Creek. On New Year’s Eve 2005, Grayson Creek and Murderer's Creek overflowed, flooding approximately 80 homes and causing $2M-$3 M in damages (a 35-40 year rainfall event). In December 1997 the creeks also escaped their banks and flooded with a similar amount of damage during an 18 year storm event. Murderer’s Creek escaped its banks again on January 4, 2008. A United States Army Corps of Engineers Phase I Feasibility Study is ongoing to evaluate Grayson and Murderer's Creeks for a federal flood control project that will improve flood protection in the highly populated floodplain, while leaving the creek in its natural state, to:
 Reducing/eliminating the potential for future flooding;
 Providing habitat for migratory birds, fish and other wildlife; and
 Allowing for linkages with recreational and park land.

The current effort has evolved from a history of battles between environmentalists and government planners, beginning with a 1984 Contra Costa County Planning Department proposal to convert the East Fork of Grayson Creek, Murderer's Creek and Matson Creek to concrete lined channels. This led to the formation of a citizen's group called Friends of Creeks in Urban Settings or FOCUS (now an affiliate of the Urban Creeks Council), founded by Beverly Ortiz, a faculty lecturer of California State University, East Bay.

See also
 List of watercourses in the San Francisco Bay Area
 North American beaver

References

External links
 East Contra Costa County Historical Creek Map

Rivers of Contra Costa County, California
Rivers of Northern California
Tributaries of San Pablo Bay